C/2002 VQ94 (LINEAR) is a long period comet with a comet nucleus estimated to be  in diameter. It was discovered on 11 November 2002 by LINEAR.

The comet has an observation arc of 9.5 years allowing a very good estimate of the inbound (original) and outbound (future) orbits. The orbit of a long-period comet is properly obtained when the osculating orbit is computed at an epoch after leaving the planetary region and is calculated with respect to the center of mass of the Solar System. Inbound JPL Horizons shows an epoch 1950 barycentric orbital period of 2,597 years with aphelion of 371 AU from the Sun. Outbound with an epoch of 2050 JPL Horizons shows a period of approximately 2,521 years and an aphelion distance of 364 AU.

Even though they have a large nucleus, comets such as C/2002 VQ94 (≈100 km), 95P/Chiron (≈200 km), and C/2014 UN271 (≈150 km) do not become visible to the naked eye because they stay outside of the inner Solar System. The Comet of 1729 (≈100 km) was visible to the naked eye as it passed  from the Sun. Comet Hale-Bopp (≈60 km) came within 1 AU of the Sun.

References 
 

Non-periodic comets
20021111